The following is a list of films produced in the Kannada film industry in India in 1963, presented in alphabetical order.

See also
Kannada films of 1962
Kannada films of 1964

References

External links
 Kannada Movies of 1963's at the Internet Movie Database
 http://www.bharatmovies.com/kannada/info/moviepages.htm
 http://www.kannadastore.com/

1963
Kannada
Films, Kannada